Boy A is the debut novel by Jonathan Trigell, which was first published in 2004.

Premise
The book is the story of a child criminal released into society as an adult, taking its title from the court practice of concealing the identity of child defendants and child killers.

Success
Published by Serpent's Tail in English speaking countries, the novel has been translated into French under the title Jeux d'Enfants published by Gallimard and also into Chinese, Russian, Dutch and Spanish. It won the 2004 John Llewellyn Rhys Prize and the 2005 Waverton Good Read Award. On World Book Day (UK) 2008, Boy A was voted the most discussion-worthy novel by a living writer in the Spread The Word poll.

Television adaptation

The book was adapted into a BAFTA award-winning TV movie that was released theatrically in some areas. The film was made by Cuba Pictures and written by Mark O'Rowe, and premiered at the 2007 Toronto International Film Festival. It was directed by John Crowley and starred Andrew Garfield (who won the 2008 Best Actor BAFTA TV Award for his performance), Peter Mullan and Katie Lyons. The film was released cinematically in the US by the Weinstein Company on 23 July 2008.

Similarities with the James Bulger case
The book and film share several similarities with the notorious murder of James Bulger at the hands of two ten-year-old boys in 1993. Jonathan Trigell has said that the character of Jack/Eric is actually based on a childhood friend of his who had struggled with life outside prison after serving a lengthy sentence (although not, as the writer states, for murder). Trigell has however admitted that the media frenzy surrounding the Bulger murderer's release at the time the novel was written did serve as an influence of sorts on the book.

References

External links
Book review from The Independent newspaper.
Video Clip of Trigell describing the novel.
Report of Boy A winning the World Book Day Prize in The Guardian newspaper.

2004 British novels
Social realism
British novels adapted into films
John Llewellyn Rhys Prize-winning works
2004 debut novels
Serpent's Tail books